Guatay (Kumeyaay: Na-wa Ti'e, meaning "Big House") is an unincorporated community in the Cuyamaca Mountains, in the Mountain Empire area of southeastern San Diego County, California.

Geography
The town's elevation is 3,999 feet (1,219 m).  Although Guatay is unincorporated, it does not have a post office. The ZIP code is 91931.

It was the location of a 19th-century stagecoach station on the San Antonio-San Diego Mail Line.

Nearby Guatay Mountain, a peak of the Cuyamaca Mountains, is home to a grove of the rare endemic Tecate Cypress (Cupressus forbesii).

References

Unincorporated communities in San Diego County, California
Cuyamaca Mountains
San Antonio–San Diego Mail Line
Unincorporated communities in California
Stagecoach stops in the United States